Vārme Parish is an administrative unit of Kuldīga Municipality in the Courland region of Latvia. The parish has a population of 1114 (as of 1/07/2010) and covers an area of 147.33 km2.

Villages of Vārme parish 
 Dūras
 Vārme
 Vecvārme
 Zalkšciems

See also 
 Vārme Manor

External links 
Vārme parish in Latvian

Parishes of Latvia
Kuldīga Municipality
Courland